Pierre "Peter" Charles L'Enfant (August 2, 1754June 14, 1825) was an American-French military engineer who in 1791 designed the basic plan for Washington, D.C., the capital city of the United States. His work is known today as the L'Enfant Plan.  He also inspired the street plan for Detroit, Michigan.

Early life and education
L'Enfant was born in Paris, France, on August 2, 1754, as the third child and second son of Pierre L'Enfant (1704–1787), a painter and professor at Royal Academy of Painting and Sculpture known for his panoramas of battles, and Marie Leullier, the daughter of a French military officer. In 1758, his brother Pierre Joseph died at six, and Pierre Charles became the eldest son. He studied art at the Royal Academy from 1771 until 1776, when he left school in France to enlist in the American Revolutionary War on the side of the rebelling colonials.

Military service
L'Enfant was recruited by Pierre Augustin Caron de Beaumarchais to serve in the American Revolutionary War in the United States. He arrived in 1777 at the age of 23, and served as a military engineer in the Continental Army with Major General Lafayette. He was commissioned as a captain in the Corps of Engineers on April 3, 1779, to rank from February 18, 1778.

Despite his aristocratic origins, L'Enfant closely identified with the United States, changing his first name from Pierre to Peter when he first came to the rebelling colonies in 1777. L'Enfant served on General George Washington's staff at Valley Forge. While there, the Marquis de Lafayette commissioned L'Enfant to paint a portrait of Washington.

During the war, L'Enfant made a number of pencil portraits of George Washington and other Continental Army officers. He also made at least two paintings of Continental Army encampments.

L'Enfant was wounded at the Siege of Savannah on October 9, 1779. He recovered and became a prisoner of war at the surrender of Charleston, South Carolina on May 12, 1780. He was exchanged in November 1780 and served on General Washington's staff for the remainder of the American Revolution. L'Enfant was promoted by brevet to Major in the Corps of Engineers on May 2, 1783, in recognition of his service to the cause of American liberty. He was discharged when the Continental Army was disbanded in December 1783.

Career

Post–Revolutionary War
Following the American Revolutionary War, L'Enfant established a successful and highly profitable civil engineering firm in New York City. He achieved some fame as an architect by redesigning the City Hall in New York for the First Congress of the United States (See: Federal Hall).

L'Enfant also designed furniture and houses for the wealthy, as well as coins and medals. Among the medals was the eagle-shaped badge of the Society of the Cincinnati, an organization of former officers of the Continental Army of which he was a founder.  At the request of George Washington, the first President of the Society, L'Enfant had the insignias made in France during a 1783–84 visit to his father and helped to organize a chapter of the Society there.

L'Enfant was a friend of Alexander Hamilton. Some of their correspondences from 1793 to 1801 now reside in the Library of Congress.

While L'Enfant was in New York City, he was initiated into Freemasonry. His initiation took place on April 17, 1789, at Holland Lodge No. 8, F & A M, which the Grand Lodge of New York F & A M had chartered in 1787. L'Enfant took only the first of three degrees offered by the Lodge and did not progress further in Freemasonry.

Plan for Federal City

The new Constitution of the United States, which took effect in March and April 1789, gave the newly organized Congress of the United States authority to establish a federal district up to 10 miles square in size. L'Enfant had already written first to President George Washington, asking to be commissioned to plan the city. However, a decision on the capital was put on hold until July 1790 when the First Congress passed the "Residence Act", setting the site of the new federal district and national capital to be on the shores of the Potomac River.

The Residence Act was the result of an important early political compromise between northern and southern congressional delegations, brokered by new cabinet members, Secretary of the Treasury Alexander Hamilton of New York and political opponent, Secretary of State Thomas Jefferson, of Virginia. It specified the new capital would be situated on the northern and southern banks of the Potomac River, at some location, to be determined by the president, between the Eastern Branch (now referred to as the Anacostia River) near Washington's estate of Mount Vernon and the confluence with the Conococheague Creek, further upstream near Hagerstown, Maryland. The Residence Act also gave authority to President Washington to appoint three commissioners to oversee the survey of the ten mile square federal district and "according to such Plans, as the President shall approve," provide public buildings to accommodate the Federal government in 1800.

President Washington appointed L'Enfant in 1791 to plan the new "Federal City" (later named the "City of Washington") under the supervision of the three Commissioners, whom Washington had appointed to oversee the planning and development of the federal territory that would later become designated the "District of Columbia". Included in the new district were the river port towns of Georgetown (formerly in Montgomery County of the State of Maryland) and Alexandria (in Fairfax County, in the Commonwealth of Virginia). Thomas Jefferson, who worked alongside President Washington in overseeing the plans for the capital, sent L'Enfant a letter outlining his task, which was to provide a drawing of suitable sites for the federal city and the public buildings. Though Jefferson had modest ideas for the Capital, L'Enfant saw the task as far more grandiose, believing he was locating the capital, devising the city plan, and designing the buildings.

L'Enfant arrived in Georgetown on March 9, 1791, and began his work, from Suter's Fountain Inn. Washington arrived later on March 28, to meet with L'Enfant and the Commissioners for several days. On June 22, L'Enfant presented his first plan for the federal city to the President. On August 19, he appended a new map to a letter that he sent to the President.

President Washington retained a copy of one of L'Enfant's plans, showed it to the Congress, and later gave it to the three Commissioners. The U.S. Library of Congress now holds both the plan that Washington apparently gave to the Commissioners and an undated anonymous "dotted line" survey map that the Library considers L'Enfant to have drawn before August 19, 1791.

The full plan identifies "Peter Charles L'Enfant" as its author in the last line of an oval in its upper left corner. The "dotted line" survey map may be one that L'Enfant appended to his August 19 letter to the President.

L'Enfant's "Plan of the city intended for the permanent seat of the government of the United States..." encompassed an area bounded by the Potomac River, the Eastern Branch, the base of the escarpment of the Atlantic Seaboard Fall Line, and Rock Creek. His plan specified locations for two buildings, the "Congress House" (the United States Capitol) and the "President's House" (known after its 1815–1817 rebuilding and re-painting of its stone walls, as the "White House" or "Executive Mansion").

The "Congress House" would be built on "Jenkins Hill" (later to be known as "Capitol Hill"), which L'Enfant described as a "pedestal awaiting a monument". The "President's House" would be located at a northwest diagonal from the "Congress House" along the future Pennsylvania Avenue. The "President's House" would be situated on a ridge parallel to the Potomac River, north of a riverfront marsh and a canal (known as "Tiber Canal" or the "Washington City Canal" during the 1800s).

L'Enfant envisioned the "President's House" to have public gardens and monumental architecture. Reflecting his grandiose visions, he specified that the "President's House" (occasionally referred to as the "President's Palace") would be five times the size of the building that was actually constructed, even then becoming the largest residence then constructed in America. Emphasizing the importance of the new Nation's Legislature, the "Congress House" would be located on a longitude designated as 0:0.

The plan specified that most streets would be laid out in a grid. To form the grid, some streets (later named for letters of the alphabet) would travel in an east–west direction, while others (named for numbers) would travel in a north–south direction. Diagonal broader avenues, later named after the states of the Union, crossed the north–south-east/west grid. The diagonal avenues intersected with the north–south and east–west streets at circles and rectangular plazas that would later honor notable Americans and provide open space.

L'Enfant laid out a -wide garden-lined "grand avenue", which he expected to travel for about  along an east–west axis in the center of an area that would later become the National Mall. He also laid out a narrower avenue (Pennsylvania Avenue) which would connect the "Congress House" with the "President's House". In time, Pennsylvania Avenue developed into the capital city's present "grand avenue".

L'Enfant's plan additionally laid out a system of canals (later designated as the Washington City Canal) that would pass the "Congress House" and the "President's House". One branch of the canal would empty into the Potomac River south of the "President's House" at the mouth of old Tiber Creek, which would be channelized and straightened.

L'Enfant secured the lease of quarries at Wigginton Island and further southeast along Aquia Creek off the lower Potomac River's southern bank in Virginia to supply well-regarded "Aquia Creek sandstone" for the foundation and later for the wall slabs and blocks of the "Congress House" in November 1791. However, his temperament and his insistence that his city design be realized as a whole brought him into conflict with the Commissioners, who wanted to direct the limited funds available into the construction of the Federal buildings. In this, they had the support of Secretary of State Thomas Jefferson.

During a contentious period in February 1792, Andrew Ellicott, who had been conducting the original boundary survey of the future District of Columbia (see: Boundary Stones (District of Columbia)) and the survey of the "Federal City" under the direction of the Commissioners, informed the Commissioners that L'Enfant had not been able to have the city plan engraved and had refused to provide him with the original plan (of which L'Enfant had prepared several versions). Ellicott, with the aid of his brother, Benjamin Ellicott, then revised the plan, despite L'Enfant's protests. Ellicott's revisions, which included the straightening of the longer avenues and the removal of L'Enfant's Square No. 15, created changes to the city's layout (See: Randolph Square).

Andrew Ellicott stated in his letters that, although he was refused the original plan, he was familiar with L'Enfant's system and had many notes of the surveys that he had made himself.  It is, therefore, possible that Ellicott recreated the plan. Ellicott's brother Joseph later adopted the radial plan of Washington for Buffalo, NY.

Shortly thereafter, Washington dismissed L'Enfant. After L'Enfant departed, Andrew Ellicott continued the city survey in accordance with the revised plan, several versions of which were engraved, published and distributed. As a result, Ellicott's revisions subsequently became the basis for the capital city's development.

The work of André Le Nôtre, particularly his Gardens of Versailles, is said to have influenced L'Enfant's master plan for the capital.

Later works

Soon after leaving the national capital area, L'Enfant prepared the initial plans for the city of Paterson, in northeast New Jersey along the Passaic River, but was discharged from this project after a year had passed. However, in 1846 the city reinstated the original scheme proposed by L'Enfant after the city's raceway system encountered problems. During the same period (1792–1793) he designed Robert Morris's mansion in Philadelphia, which was never finished because of his delays and Morris's bankruptcy.  In 1794, L'Enfant was placed in charge of reconstructing Fort Mifflin on Mud Island in the Delaware River below Philadelphia.

In 1812, L'Enfant was offered a position as a professor of engineering at United States Military Academy, at West Point, New York, but declined that post. He later served as a professor of engineering at West Point from 1813 to 1817. In 1814, L'Enfant worked briefly on the construction of Fort Washington on the Potomac River southeast of Washington, D.C., but others soon replaced him.

L'Enfant had no part in planning or platting Perrysburg, Ohio, or Indianapolis, Indiana, as has been claimed in Internet postings. Alexander Bourne, Joseph Wampler and William Brookfield surveyed and platted the future Perrysburg area in 1816. Alexander Ralston, an engineer who had assisted L'Enfant in planning the city of Washington, used elements of L'Enfant's plan for his own design and survey in the 1820s of the future city of Indianapolis (the state capital of Indiana).

Death
Although the United States Congress had paid him for his work on the design of the City of Washington, L'Enfant died in poverty on June 14, 1825. He was originally buried at the Green Hill farm in Chillum, Prince George's County, Maryland. He left behind three watches, three compasses, some books, some maps, and surveying instruments, the total value was forty-six dollars.

Legacy

In 1901 and 1902, the McMillan Commission under the leadership of Senator James McMillan, (1838–1902), of Michigan, modified L'Enfant's plan within a report that recommended a partial redesign of the capital city. Among other things, the commission's report laid out a plan for a sweeping mall in the area of L'Enfant's widest "grand avenue", which had not yet been constructed. The McMillan Plan has since been instrumental in the further development of Washington, D.C. (See: History of Washington, D.C. in the 20th century).

At the instigation of a French ambassador to the United States, Jean Jules Jusserand, L'Enfant's adopted nation then recognized his contributions. In 1909, L'Enfant's remains were exhumed from their burial site at Green Hill and placed in a metal-lined casket.  After lying in state at the Capitol rotunda, L'Enfant was re-interred in front of Arlington House on a slope in Arlington National Cemetery in Virginia.  His re-burial site overlooks the Potomac River and the portion of Washington, D.C., that he had originally designed.

In 1911,  a monument was placed on top of L'Enfant's grave during a dedication ceremony at which President William Howard Taft, Jusserand, and Senator Elihu Root spoke. Engraved on the monument is a portion of L'Enfant's plan in a diagram map, which Andrew Ellicott's revision and the McMillan Commission's plan had superseded.

Honors
 In 1942, an American cargo-carrying Liberty ship in World War II, named the S.S. Pierre L'Enfant was launched, part of a series of almost 2,000 ships mass-produced in an "assembly-line" fashion from eleven coastal shipyards. In 1970, she was shipwrecked and abandoned.
 L'Enfant Plaza, a complex of office buildings, was dedicated in 1968 and named for the architect. It includes the 1972 headquarters of the United States Postal Service, an adjacent L'Enfant Plaza Hotel, an office building and underground parking garage, and a series of underground corridors with a shopping center, centered around an esplanade ('L'Enfant Promenade") in southwest Washington, D.C.. Meeting rooms in the L'Enfant Plaza Hotel bear the names of French artists, military leaders, and explorers. The central portion of the plaza contains an engraved map of the city by Pierre L'Enfant from 1791. Within the city map is a smaller map that shows the plaza's location.
 Beneath L'Enfant Plaza is one of the central Metro subway stops in Washington, D.C., the L'Enfant Plaza station.

 In 1980, Western Plaza (subsequently renamed to "Freedom Plaza") opened in downtown Washington, D.C., adjacent to Pennsylvania Avenue, N.W. A raised marble inlay in the Plaza's surface depicts parts of L'Enfant's 1791 plan for the City of Washington. The inlay contains an oval bearing the title of the plan followed by the words "By Peter Charles L'Enfant".
 In 2003, L'Enfant's 1791 Plan for Washington was commemorated on a USPS commemorative postage stamp. The diamond shape of the stamp reflects the original  tract of land selected for the District. Shown is a view along the National Mall, including the Capitol, the Washington Monument, and the Lincoln Memorial. Also portrayed are cherry blossoms around the "Tidal Basin" and row houses from the Shaw neighborhood.
 The Government of the District of Columbia commissioned a statue of L'Enfant in 2008 that now resides in the U.S. Capitol as part of the National Statuary Hall Collection as of February 2022. Federal Law only allows U.S. states (and not federal territories, commonwealths, districts or other possessions) to contribute statues to the Collection, which the District of Columbia's Delegate to the U.S. House of Representatives, Eleanor Holmes Norton, attempted to have Congress change the law to permit the installation of the statue to represent the District in the Statuary Hall. The statue was displayed in the historic John A. Wilson District Building for the municipal government offices on Pennsylvania Avenue prior to the Capitol.
 Since 2005, the National Building Museum in Washington, D.C. has held an annual "L'Enfant Lecture on City Planning and Design" to draw attention to critical issues in city and regional planning in the United States.
 The American Planning Association (APA) has created an award named in "L'Enfant's honor" which recognizes excellence in international planning.

Notes

References

Bibliography

Further reading
 Mann, Nicholas, Sacred Geometry of Washington, D.C.: The Integrity and Power of the Original Design'', Green Magic 2006.  
 Ovason, David, The Secret Architecture of Our Nation's Capital: the Masons and the building of Washington, D.C., New York City: Perennial, 2002.

External links

 
 

L'Enfant, Pierre Charles
L'Enfant, Pierre Charles
L'Enfant, Pierre Charles
L'Enfant, Pierre Charles
L'Enfant, Pierre Charles
L'Enfant, Pierre Charles
L'Enfant, Pierre Charles
L'Enfant, Pierre Charles
L'Enfant, Pierre Charles
L'Enfant, Pierre Charles
L'Enfant, Pierre Charles